The British Army Training Unit Kenya (BATUK) is a training support unit of the British Army located in Kenya. It provides a location for combined arms light role infantry battle group exercises, forward operating bases and engineering. It constitutes two key locations: Kifaru Barracks, which is a logistical hub within a Kenyan Army base in Nairobi, and Laikipia Air Base (East) in Nanyuki, which hosts the HQ and training ground.

Controversy has arisen due to allegations that British soldiers serving as a part of BATUK have been involved in criminal acts which have gained media attention in both Britain and Kenya, including murder, brawls, rape, sexual assaults, an alleged child kidnapping,  environmental damage, fatal hit-and-runs, the sexual exploitation of Kenyan women, and deaths caused by the negligent handling of unexploded ordnance. No British personnel have been convicted, and some diplomatic disputes have arisen as a result.

History

Current status
The UK Ministry of Defence (MoD) maintains a longstanding Defence Cooperation Agreement with the Kenyan Government whereby up to six British infantry battalions (10,000 service personnel) per year may carry out four-week exercises on Kenya Ministry of Defence land at Archer's Post and in Laikipia County.

The exercises are run by BATUK from its base at Nyati Barracks in Nanyuki, 200 km north of the capital. In addition three Royal Engineers squadrons carry out civil engineering projects, while two medical company group deployments provide primary health care assistance to the civilian community.  Britain offers training opportunities in the UK to the Kenyan military and conducts joint exercises with the Kenya Defence Forces (KDF). It also supports Kenya's struggle against Al Shabaab, including the deployment of British personnel to Somalia to provide the KDF with logistical support and contributions towards anti-terrorism training for the Kenya Police and border guards.

Controversy

Incidents of Sexual Assaults 
Units attached to Batuk have been accused of multiple incidents of rape during the period between 1965 and 2001.

2013 killing of armed Kenyan intruder
BATUK has been the centre of several diplomatic disputes between the British and Kenyan governments. In 2013, a British Army sergeant fatally shot an armed Kenyan after believing they were intruding and preparing to commit theft. This escalated an ongoing dispute which centred around Kenyan jurisdiction over British personnel and whether or not they should be tried in Kenya for any violations of Kenyan law. The sergeant was confined to barracks for seven months whilst an investigation was underway, before being removed from the country. A similar incident occurred in 2011 but did not result in a fatality.

Unexploded ordnance and alleged abduction 
Allegations have also been made that up to 50 Kenyans (mostly farmers) have been killed by unexploded British ordnance since 1945 and that British military equipment has been subject to large-scale theft by Kenyans. A 10-year-old Kenyan boy was also alleged to have been abducted by British troops after he had been injured by UK ordnance—an allegation which was strongly denied by the British government. Kenyan media has also alleged that British personnel have been involved in fatal hit-and-runs, mass brawls, and murder, but no individuals have been identified or prosecuted. The unresolved alleged murder of Agnes Wanjiru by a British soldier in 2012 resulted in family members launching legal action against the Ministry of Defence. The British government has contended that civilian injuries only occur when civilians illegally encroach onto the marked training areas and that any unexploded ordnance may also be left by the Kenyan Army which shares the training areas. In September 2015, talks between British Prime Minister David Cameron and Kenyan President Uhuru Kenyatta resulted in an agreement which clarified that British soldiers would be tried in Kenya—but not necessarily to Kenyan law—and that British military sites would be subject to Kenyan inspection. Additionally, increased training opportunities were to be offered to Kenyan troops.

Fire at Lolldaiga 
In March of 2021, a fire was reported at the Lolldaiga Conservancy in Nanyuki during which five elephants and one calf were killed. The fire which was blamed on a military exercise by the 2nd Battalion, Mercian Regiment gained public attention after a Snapchat post by a British Army soldier.

In April 2022, a Daily Telegraph report claimed that British Army soldiers started the fire at Lolldaiga while allegedly "high on cocaine". According to the same news report, Judge Antonina Bore of the Kenyan High Court gave instructions that local residents and the environmental group, The African Centre for Corrective and Preventive Action (ACCPA), should seek a dispute resolution process with the British government.

Murder of Agnes Wanjiru 
In October of 2021, a report in the Sunday Times alleged that a soldier attached to the Duke of Lancasters Regiment, stabbed and dumped the body of  Agnes Wanjiru in a septic tank.

A legal inquest in 2019 by Njeri Thuku, principal magistrate for Nanyuki Law Court stated, “After the conclusion of the inquest, I have formed the opinion that Agnes was murdered by British soldiers.” Magistrate Njeri Thuku further wrote. “It may have been one or two. But what is certain was that it was British soldiers because they were dressed in their uniform. She went missing on March 31, 2012, and it is probable she died that night.”

In reaction to the report, the Kenyan Cabinet Secretary for Defence, Eugene Wamalwa acknowledged the incident during a meeting, in November 2021, with the National Assembly Committee of Defence and Foreign Relations.

The family of Agnes Wanjiru released a statement about their intention to sue the British Ministry of Defence over the alleged murder.

Infrastructure improvements
In 2015, the BATUK Infrastructure Development Programme began to improve the infrastructure of BATUK. Previously, the BATUK HQ, offices, stores and training support facilities were situated on land leased from the Nanyuki Agricultural Society, which had to be vacated each year to make way for an agricultural show. The BATUK Infrastructure Development Programme will establish new permanent facilities at Laikipia Air Base East (LAB(E)), a former RAF station which is now occupied by the Kenyan Air Force.

As part of the programme, a new barracks was opened in January 2021, located in Nanyuki, to be used for "something beyond just training".

British Army installations in Kenya

References

External links

British Army - Africa

Training units and formations of the British Army
Kenya–United Kingdom military relations
Military installations of the United Kingdom in other countries
Kenya and the Commonwealth of Nations
United Kingdom and the Commonwealth of Nations